Gangway for Tomorrow is a 1943 American anthology film produced and directed by the Austrian-American John H. Auer, and originally known by its working title, An American Story.  Steeped in the propaganda tones of early World War II features, the film is largely B-fare.

Plot

Five defense workers on their way to the munitions factory tell their stories:  a refugee from the French Resistance, a frustrated race car driver, a prison warden, a former Miss America, and an intellectual who dropped out of society and saw the country as a bum.

Cast

 Margo as Lisette Rene
 John Carradine as Mr. Wellington
 Robert Ryan as Joe Dunham
 Amelita Ward as Mary Jones, Miss America
 William Terry as Bob Nolan
 Harry Davenport as Fred Taylor
 James Bell as Tom Burke
 Charles Arnt as Jim Benson
 Alan Carney as Swallow
 Wally Brown as Sam
 Erford Gage as Dan Barton
 Richard Ryen as Colonel Mueller
 Warren Hymer as Pete
 Michael St. Angel as Mechanic
 Don Dillaway as Mechanic
 Sam McDaniel as Hank 
 John Wald as Radio Announcer
 Ludwig Donath as Polish Worker 
 unbilled players include Rita Corday

Reception
Despite its attempt to divert from the usual formulaic patriotic films of the period, Gangway for Tomorrow was relegated to second billing in  most theatres. Critical reviews, however, were more sympathetic, the New York Daily Mirror noted, "The screen as a medium for useful propaganda is well illustrated by Gangway for Tomorrow ... Turning in the best performances are Margo, John Carradine ... and Robert Ryan." In a similar vein; "An unpretentious little film, running at just 69 minutes, Gangway is nevertheless fresh and bright in treatment and provides an interesting story of five factory workers ... The members of the cast, in particular, Margo and Robert Ryan, handle their assignments well."

References

Notes

Bibliography

 Jarlett, Franklin. Robert Ryan: A Biography and Critical Filmography. Jefferson, North Carolina: McFarland & Company, 1997. .

External links
 
 
 Turner Classic Movies page

1943 films
American black-and-white films
RKO Pictures films
World War II films made in wartime
Films scored by Roy Webb
Films directed by John H. Auer
American anthology films
American drama films
1943 drama films